Australian pop duo The Veronicas have released five studio albums, two live albums, one compilation album, three extended plays, twenty-four singles, fifteen music videos and two video albums. Their debut studio album, The Secret Life Of..., was released in Australia in October 2005. Influenced by pop rock, pop punk and teen pop genres, the album was successful in Australia, where it reached number two and gained quadruple Platinum certification from the Australian Recording Industry Association (ARIA). The album's lead single, "4ever", peaked at number two on the Australian Singles Chart and became a top-twenty hit in countries such as Ireland, New Zealand and the United Kingdom. Four additional singles were released from the album, including "Everything I'm Not" and "When It All Falls Apart", which reached the top ten in Australia and earned Gold certification.

The Veronicas' second studio album, Hook Me Up, was released in November 2007. Musically, Hook Me Up differs from its predecessor and features the genres of dance and electronic. It reached number two in Australia and was certified double Platinum. The album's title track became The Veronicas' first number one single on the Australian Singles Chart. Subsequent single "Untouched" became their most successful release worldwide, peaking at number one in Ireland, number two in Australia, and the top ten in Canada, New Zealand and the United Kingdom. In the United States, "Untouched" became the first single by an Australian act to sell one million downloads. Hook Me Up also produced the top-ten hits "This Love" and "Take Me on the Floor", both of which were certified Gold in Australia. Following a hiatus, The Veronicas released "Lolita" in 2012, which charted in the top forty of the Australian Singles Chart and was certified Gold. Their self-titled third studio album was released in November 2014, seven years after their previous album Hook Me Up (2007). The Veronicas contains multiple genres such as blues, trip hop, rock and roll, grunge and rap, while still retaining some of their more familiar pop rock and electronic rock sound. The album's first single, "You Ruin Me", debuted at number one on the Australian Singles Chart, becoming their second number one single and their first to debut in the top spot. "In My Blood" became the girls' third number one single in Australia, remaining at number one for two consecutive weeks. A follow-up single, "On Your Side", was released on 15 October 2016; a further follow-up called "The Only High" came out in 2017, with a later single "Think of Me" coming out in 2019. They followed that up with "Biting My Tongue" in 2020 and then they announced their forthcoming album would be called Human, also announced that year. They announced and then released the single "Godzilla" from Godzilla the album in May 2021, released before Human, which came out a month later (June 2021). They eventually signed with Big Noise in 2022.

Albums

Studio albums

Live albums

Compilation albums

Extended plays

Singles

As lead artist

Promotional singles

As featured artist

See also
List of songs recorded by the Veronicas

Notes

Other appearances

Videography

Video albums

Music videos

References 
General
 

Specific

Discography
Discographies of Australian artists
Veronicas, The